Rod Frawley (born 8 September 1952) is a former tennis player from Australia, who won one singles title (1982, Adelaide) and five doubles titles during his professional career. The right-hander reached his highest ATP singles ranking of world No. 43 in December 1980. His highest ranking in doubles, world No. 23, was achieved in March 1980.

Frawley reached the semifinals of Wimbledon in 1981, before losing to eventual champion John McEnroe.

He is the older brother of John Frawley.

Career finals

Singles (1 title, 1 runner-up)

Doubles (5 titles, 11 runner-ups)

References

External links
 
 

Living people
1952 births
Australian male tennis players
Tennis players from Brisbane
20th-century Australian people
21st-century Australian people